Anne Lise Kjaer (born 15 March 1962 in Denmark) is a London-based futurist and keynote speaker. Also known as a Future Narrator, her specialty is futures studies and consumer mindsets. She is founder of Kjaer Global, a trend forecasting agency that works with corporations, including Sony, Nokia,  Swarovski, IKEA, Gap and Toyota. In a 2004 interview about mapping future trends, Matthew Temple of the Financial Times said: “Kjaer’s world is as fertile as Dali’s, only she creates social prototypes.”

Biography

Born in Esbjerg, Kjaer is the daughter of Niels Peter Kjaer, a commercial fisherman, and Inge Agnete Jørgensen. She grew up in Hvide Sande and studied in Herning, graduating as a designer in 1983. She has a son, Vicente, from her first marriage to Colombian artist Oswaldo Maciá. She married Norwegian architect Harald Brekke in 2009.

Career
Kjaer speaks at international conferences, both within Western Europe and in emerging markets.

In 2001 she held the first Time to Think conference. The 8th International Time to Think Future Trends Conference, in collaboration with Copenhagen Institute for Future Studies (CIFS), took place in Copenhagen in October 2006, taking as its theme ‘Meaningful Consumption'. Kjaer also wrote for CIFS about Emotional Consumption. In her article about the quest for meaning and emotional connection in a time of abundance, she talks about the four consumer trends that describe the advanced stage of self-realization that the modern consumer has reached.

In 2006 she was keynote speaker at Continuum ’06 in New Delhi, India – a joint conference organised by Pearl Academy of Fashion and Nottingham Trent University – choosing as her topic ‘Meaningful Consumption and Challenges of Global Fashion Leadership’.

In 2008 she spoke BledCom, at an international symposium on public relations in Slovenia. The following year saw her presenting at the 12th Annual Adam Smith Institute Russian Automotive Industry Forum.

In 2010 she took part in 2020 Shaping Ideas, an initiative by Ericsson that asks 20 thinkers about their views on the drivers of the future and how connectivity is changing the world. She also spoke at the Innovation in Mind conference at Lund University.

Also in 2010, she contributed a Thought Paper entitled A Future Vision 2030+ Leading the Way in a Changing World. This was her contribution to Challenge Futures: “The Future Book“ published in 2010.

In March 2011, Kjaer delivered a presentation for the Ageing Well Network on the No Age society and meaningful consumption. In June 2011 she spoke at the University of the Arts London, Central Saint Martins College of Art & Design on Innovation Overkill at the MA Innovation Management private viewing, part of the college's Degree Show Week.

Selected articles
COLOR MAGAZINE – Transportation 2050 – How will we move? (July 27, 2011). 
The Law of Success 2.0
Trend Watching
The Designer Magazine - Forecasting the Future.

Other activities
Kjaer retains strong links with Denmark and is a regular commentator in specialist and mainstream press. She is a member of Copenhagen Goodwill Ambassador Corps and the Danish-UK Chamber Of Commerce (DUCC). She is also part of the Visit Denmark board.

Kjaer was a member of the advisory board for Challenge Future, a global youth competition designed to foster creativity and innovation, and wrote an article on people's role in shaping the future.

References

External links
 Three Layer Cake interview 
 Kjaer profile at The London Speaker Bureau 
 Kjaer video at Celebrity Speakers

Video links
 About Kjaer Global
 Future of Innovation by Anne Lise Kjaer at Innovation in Mind
 Anne Lise Kjaer - 2020 Shaping Ideas - Ericsson
 Interview with Anne Lise Kjaer - Glocalisation
 WORKTECH is a forum for all those involved in the future of work and the workplace as well as real estate, technology and innovation. WorkTech10 is the 7th annual conference looking at implications of convergence between the worlds of technology, real estate, work and the workplace. Part 1 and Part 2
 Tomorrow's Workplace - People and Meaningful Consumption by Anne Lise Kjaer

1962 births
Living people
Futurologists
People from Esbjerg